Pavel Military School (Pavlovskoye voennoye uchilishche) (also translated as Pavlovsk Military School, Pavlovsk Military College) is a military school in St. Petersburg, Russia, established in 1863 on the basis of the Pavel Cadet Corps. It was closed in November 1917 after the October Revolution.

It was named after emperor Pavel I of Russia. Over time it had the following names:
 1829-1863 — Павловский кадетский корпус;
 1863-1894 — 1-е военное Павловское училище;
 1894- November 1917 - Павловское военное училище.

Alumni
 Aleksey Kuropatkin
 Baron Roman von Ungern-Sternberg
 Anatoly Pepelyayev

References

Military of the Russian Empire
History of Saint Petersburg
Organizations based in Saint Petersburg
Educational institutions established in 1863
1917 disestablishments in Russia
1863 establishments in the Russian Empire
19th century in Saint Petersburg